Events from the year 1898 in the United States.

Incumbents

Federal Government 
 President: William McKinley (R-Ohio)
 Vice President: Garret Hobart (R-New Jersey)
 Chief Justice: Melville Fuller (Illinois)
 Speaker of the House of Representatives: Thomas Brackett Reed (R-Maine)
 Congress: 55th

Events

January–March

 1 January – New York City annexes land from surrounding counties, creating the City of Greater New York. The city is geographically divided into five boroughs: Manhattan, Brooklyn, Queens, The Bronx, and Staten Island.
 8 January – Seminole burning: Lynching by burning of two Seminole boys near Maud, Oklahoma; 6 of the lynch mob are convicted and imprisoned, the first successful prosecution of lynching in the Southwest.
 15 February –  explodes and sinks in Havana harbor, Cuba, killing 266 men.  Popular opinion blames Spain and helps precipitate the Spanish–American War.
 22 February – Naoum Mokarzel establishes Al-Hoda which will become the longest-running Arabic newspaper in the U.S.
 24 March – Robert Allison of Port Carbon, Pennsylvania becomes the first person to buy an American-built automobile when he buys a Winton automobile that has been advertised in Scientific American.
 28 March – After an investigation, the U.S. Navy publicly concludes that  was sunk by a mine, further pushing sentiment towards war.
 30 March – The 5.8–6.4  Mare Island earthquake shook the San Francisco Bay Area with a maximum Mercalli intensity of VIII (Severe), causing $350,000 in damage.

April–June
 April 5 – Annie Oakley promotes the service of women in combat situations with the United States military. On this day, she writes a letter to President McKinley "offering the government the services of a company of 50 'lady sharpshooters' who would provide their own arms and ammunition should war break out with Spain." In the history of women in the military, there are records of female U.S. Revolutionary and Civil War soldiers who enlisted using male pseudonyms, but Oakley's letter represents possibly the earliest political move towards women's rights for combat service in the United States military.
 April 20 – President William McKinley signs a Joint Resolution with Cuba and a declaration of War against Spain, beginning the Spanish–American War.  The declaration is accepted five days later.
 April 21 – Spanish–American War: The United States Navy begins a blockade of Cuban ports and  captures a Spanish merchant ship.
 April 25 – Spanish–American War: The United States declares war on Spain; the U.S. Congress announces that a state of war has existed since April 21 (later backdating this one more day to April 20).
April 29: Union Razor Company, which today is known as KA-BAR Knives, founded in Tidioute, Pennsylvania.
 May 1 – Spanish–American War – Battle of Manila Bay: Commodore Dewey destroys the Spanish squadron. The first battle of the war, as well as the first battle in the Philippines Campaign.
 May 10 – Prescott National Forest is established.
 May 12 – Bombardment of San Juan, the first major battle of the Puerto Rico Campaign during the Spanish–American War.
 June 1 – The Trans-Mississippi Exposition World's Fair opens in Omaha, Nebraska.

July–September

 July 1 – Spanish–American War: Battle of San Juan Hill – American forces capture the San Juan Heights near Santiago de Cuba. Theodore Roosevelt memorably leads the charge of the Rough Riders.
 July 3
 Spanish–American War: Battle of Santiago de Cuba – The United States Navy destroys the Spanish Navy's Caribbean Squadron.
 Joshua Slocum completes a 3-year solo circumnavigation of the world.
 July 7 –  The United States annexes the Hawaiian Islands.
 July 17 – Spanish–American War: – Battle of Santiago Bay: Troops under United States General William R. Shafter take the city of Santiago de Cuba from the Spanish.
 July 25 – Spanish–American War: The United States invasion of Puerto Rico begins with a landing at Guánica Bay.
 August 13 – Spanish–American War: Hostilities end between American and Spanish forces in Cuba.

October–December
 October 3 – Battle of Sugar Point: Ojibwe tribesmen defeat U.S. government troops in northern Minnesota.
 October 6 – The Phi Mu Alpha Sinfonia fraternity (then the Sinfonia Club) is founded at the New England Conservatory in Boston.
 November 10 – The Wilmington Insurrection of 1898: A coup d'état by white supremacists.
 November 26 – A 2-day blizzard known as the Portland Gale piles snow in Boston, Massachusetts, and severely impacts the Massachusetts fishing industry and several coastal New England towns.
 December 10 –  The Treaty of Paris is signed, ending the Spanish–American War.
December 23 - Guam transferred to the United States Navy control on December 23, 1898, by Executive Order 108-A from 25th President William McKinley

Undated
 H. W. Perlman, American  piano manufacturer is founded.
 Wakita is founded in the Cherokee Strip, Oklahoma.
 As a result of the merger of several small oil companies, John D. Rockefeller's Standard Oil Company controls 84% of the United States's oil and most American pipelines.

Ongoing
 Gay Nineties (1890–1899)
 Progressive Era (1890s–1920s)
 Lochner era (c. 1897–c. 1937)

Births
 January 1 – Tony DeMarco, dancer (died 1965)
 January 7 – Robert LeGendre, American pentathlete and dentist (died 1931)
 January 23 – Randolph Scott, film actor (died 1987)
 February 3 – Lil Hardin Armstrong, African American jazz musician (died 1971)
 February 6 – Melvin B. Tolson, African American Modernist poet, educator, columnist, trade unionist and politician (died 1966)
 March 3 – Thomas R. Underwood, U.S. Senator from Kentucky from 1951 to 1952 (died 1956)
 March 4 – Robert Schmertz, folk musician and architect (died 1975)
 April 1 – William James Sidis, child prodigy (died 1944)
 April 3 – George Jessel, comedic entertainer (died 1981)
 April 9 – Paul Robeson, African American bass singer and civil rights activist (died 1976)
 May 5
 Elsie Eaves, civil engineer (died 1983)
 Blind Willie McTell, African American blues singer/guitarist (died 1959)
 June 19 – James Joseph Sweeney, first Catholic Bishop of Honolulu from 1941 (died 1968)
 June 21 – Donald C. Peattie, botanist and author (died 1964)
 July 2
 George J. Folsey, cinematographer (died 1988)
 Anthony McAuliffe, general (died 1975)
 July 9 – Al Bedner, American football player (died 1988)
 July 14 – Happy Chandler, U.S. Senator from Kentucky from 1955 to 1959 (died 1991)
 July 17 – Berenice Abbott, photographer (died 1991)
 July 22
 Stephen Vincent Benét, poet and fiction writer (died 1943)
 Alexander Calder, sculptor and artist (died 1976)
 August 26 – Peggy Guggenheim, art collector (died 1979 in Italy)
 August 28 – Malcolm Cowley, novelist, poet, literary critic and journalist (died 1989)
 September 9 – Styles Bridges, U.S. Senator from New Hampshire from 1937 to 1961 (died 1961)
 September 10 – Waldo Semon, inventor (died 1999)
 September 26 – George Gershwin, composer (died 1937)
 October 3 – Morgan Farley, actor (died 1988)
 October 7 – Joe Giard, baseball player (died 1956)
 October 16 – William O. Douglas, Associate Justice of the Supreme Court of the United States from 1939 to 1975 (died 1980)
 November 13 – Wallace F. Bennett, U.S. Senator from Utah from 1951 to 1974 (died 1993)
 November 16 – Warren Sturgis McCulloch, neurophysiologist and cybernetician (died 1969)
 November 17 – William A. Blakley, U.S. Senator from Texas in 1961 (died 1976)
 December 5 – Grace Moore, operatic soprano (died 1947 in aviation accident)
 December 9 – Emmett Kelly, clown (died 1979)
 December 14 – Lillian Randolph, African American actress and singer (died 1980)
 December 24 – Baby Dodds, African American jazz drummer (died 1959)
 December 27 – Hilda Vaughn, actress (died 1957)

Deaths
 January 3 – Lawrence Sullivan Ross, Confederate brigadier general, Texas governor and president of Texas A&M University (born 1838)
 January 7 – Joseph O'Dwyer, physician (born 1841)
 February 17 – Frances Willard, educator, temperance reformer and women's suffragist (born 1839)
 March 6 – Hugh J. Jewett, politician and president of the Erie Railroad from 1874 to 1884 (born 1817).
 March 17 – Blanche Bruce, U.S. Senator from Mississippi from 1875 to 1881 (born 1841)
 March 18 – Matilda Joslyn Gage, feminist (born 1826)
 May 22 – Edward Bellamy, novelist (born 1850)
 July 8 – Soapy Smith, con artist and gangster (born 1860)
 July 11 – Omar D. Conger, U.S. Senator from Michigan from 1881 to 1887 (born 1818)
 July 17 – John Stuart Williams, U.S. Senator from Kentucky from 1879 to 1885 (born 1818)
 September 2 – Wilford Woodruff, fourth president of the Church of Jesus Christ of Latter-day Saints (born 1807)
 September 14 – William Seward Burroughs I, inventor of the adding machine (born 1855)
 September 21 – William W. Eaton, U.S. Senator from Connecticut from 1875 to 1881 (born 1816)
 September 26 – Fanny Davenport, actress (born 1850)
 September 28 – Thomas F. Bayard, U.S. Senator from Delaware from 1869 to 1885 and Secretary of State from 1885 to 1889 (born 1828)
 October 12 – John M. Forbes, merchant, philanthropist and abolitionist, president of the Michigan Central and Chicago, Burlington and Quincy Railroads (born 1813)
 October 31 – Joseph R. West, U.S. Senator from Louisiana from 1871 to 1877 (born 1822)
 November 8 – Robert Franklin Armfield, U.S. Representative from North Carolina (born 1829)
 November 19 – Don Carlos Buell, United States Army officer who fought in the Seminole War, the Mexican–American War and the American Civil War (born 1818)
 December 15 – Calvin S. Brice, U.S. Senator from Ohio from 1891 to 1897 (born 1845)
 December 18 – Thomas W. Osborn, U.S. Senator from Florida from 1868 to 1873 (born 1833)

See also
 List of American films of the 1890s
 Timeline of United States history (1860–1899)

References

External links
 

 
1890s in the United States
United States
United States
Years of the 19th century in the United States